Markku Salminen (9 September 1946 – 6 January 2004) was a Finnish orienteering competitor. He received a silver medal in the relay event and finished 13th in the individual event at the 1968 World Orienteering Championships in Linköping. In 1970 he finished 4th with the Finnish relay team. In 1974 he finished 16th in the individual event, and received a silver medal in the relay with the Finnish team. In 1976 he finished 5th in the individual event, and received a bronze in the relay.

See also
Finnish orienteers
List of orienteers
List of orienteering events

References

1946 births
2004 deaths
Finnish orienteers
Male orienteers
Foot orienteers
World Orienteering Championships medalists